Year 1499 (MCDXCIX) was a common year starting on Tuesday (link will display the full calendar) of the Julian calendar.

Events 
 January–December 
 January 8 – Louis XII of France marries Anne of Brittany, in accordance with a law set by his predecessor, Charles VIII.
 May 19 – 13-year-old Catherine of Aragon, the future first wife of Henry VIII of England, is married by proxy to her brother, 12-year-old Arthur, Prince of Wales.
 July 22 – Battle of Dornach: The Swiss decisively defeat the army of Maximilian I, Holy Roman Emperor.
 July 28 – First Battle of Lepanto: The Turkish navy wins a decisive victory over the Venetians.
 August – Polydore Vergil completes De inventoribus rerum, the first modern history of inventions.
 August 24 – Lake Maracaibo is discovered, by Alonso de Ojeda and Amerigo Vespucci.
 September 18 – Vasco da Gama arrives at Lisbon, returning from India, and is received by King Manuel of Portugal.
 September 22 – Treaty of Basel: Maximilian is forced to grant the Swiss de facto independence.
 October 25 – The Pont Notre-Dame in Paris, constructed under Charles VI of France, collapses into the Seine.
 November 5 – The Catholicon is published in Tréguier (Brittany). This Breton–French–Latin dictionary had been written in 1464 by Jehan Lagadeuc. It is the first dictionary of either French or Breton.
 November 23 – Perkin Warbeck, pretender to the throne of England, is hanged for reportedly attempting to escape from the Tower of London.
 November 28 – Edward Plantagenet, 17th Earl of Warwick, last male member of the House of York, is executed for reportedly attempting to escape from the Tower of London.
 December 18 – The Rebellion of the Alpujarras (1499–1501) begins in the Kingdom of Granada (Crown of Castile) against the forced conversions of Muslims in Spain.

 Date unknown 
 The French under Louis XII seize Milan, driving out Duke Ludovico Sforza; Leonardo da Vinci flees to Venice.
 Montenegro, the last free monarchy in the Balkans, is annexed by the Ottoman Empire, as part of the sanjak of Shkodër, and Stefan II Crnojević is removed from office.
 Johannes Trithemius inadvertently reveals interests in magic by writing a letter to a Carmelite monk about a treatise he is writing on steganography.
 Heinrich Cornelius Agrippa matriculates at Cologne University.
 Giggleswick School is founded by Reverend James Carr in England.

Births 
 January 15 – Samuel Maciejowski, Polish bishop (d. 1550)
 January 20 – Sebastian Franck, German humanist (d. 1543)
 January 29 – Katharina von Bora, German nun, wife of Martin Luther (d. 1552)
 February 10 – Thomas Platter, Swiss humanist scholar and writer (d. 1582)
 March 22 – Johann Carion, German astrologer and chronicler (d. 1537)
 March 31 – Pope Pius IV (d. 1565)
 May 14 – Agostino Gallo, Italian agronomist (d. 1570)
 June 24 – Johannes Brenz, German theologian and Protestant Reformer of the Duchy of Württemberg (d. 1570)
 July 17 – Maria Salviati, Italian noble and mother of Cosimo I de Medici (d. 1543)
 August 14 – John de Vere, 14th Earl of Oxford, English noble (d. 1526)
 September 3 – Diane de Poitiers, French duchess, mistress of Henry II of France (d. 1566)
 October 13 – Claude of France, queen consort of France, daughter of Louis XII of France (d. 1524)
 October 14 – Catherine of the Palatinate, Abbess of Neuburg am Neckar (d. 1526)
 October 31 – Günther XL, Count of Schwarzburg (1526–1552) (d. 1552)
 November 1 – Rodrigo of Aragon, Italian noble (d. 1512)
 December 8 – Sebald Heyden, German musicologist and theologian (d. 1561)
 December 13 – Justus Menius, German Lutheran pastor (d. 1558)
 date unknown
 Hans Asper, Swiss painter (d. 1571)
 Michael Coxcie, Flemish painter (d. 1592)
 Cesare Hercolani, Italian military leader (d. 1534)
 Jan Łaski, Polish Protestant reformer (d. 1560)
 Laurentius Petri, Archbishop of Uppsala (d. 1573)
 Giulio Romano, Italian painter (d. 1546)
 Bernardino de Sahagún, Franciscan missionary (d. 1590)
 Niccolò Fontana Tartaglia, Italian mathematician (d. 1557)
 Ming, Icelandic clam (d. 2006)
 probable – Juan Rodríguez Cabrillo, Portuguese explorer (d. 1543)

Deaths 
 January 9 – John Cicero, Elector of Brandenburg (b. 1455)
 March 24 – Edward Stafford, 2nd Earl of Wiltshire, English nobleman (b. 1470)
 April 7 – Galeotto I Pico, Duke of Mirandola (b. 1442)
 August 29 – Alesso Baldovinetti, Florentine painter (b. 1427)
 October 1 – Marsilio Ficino, Italian philosopher (b. 1433)
 November 23 – Perkin Warbeck, Flemish imposter (b. c. 1474) (executed)
 November 28 – Edward Plantagenet, 17th Earl of Warwick, last male member of the English House of York (b. 1475)
 date unknown
 Rennyo, leader of the Ikko sect of Buddhism (b. 1415)
 Muhammad Rumfa, ruler of Kano
 Laura Cereta, Italian humanist and feminist (b. 1469)

References